Lac de Saint-Mandé is a lake in the Bois de Vincennes (Paris, France). Its surface area is 0.4 km² and it contains a small island.

Saint Mande
Landforms of Paris